The Rangers or Plavci is a Czech pop folk and country music band formed in 1964 by Milan Dufek and Antonín Hájek. Its classic ensemble consisted of Milan Dufek (1944–2005;  tenor), Antonín Hájek (1944–1989; baritone), Miroslav Řihošek, Jan Vančura (countertenor), Jiří Veisser, and Radek Tomášek. The band sold over one million records.

Biography
The Rangers quickly became famous for the singing qualities of its members, from the bass of Jiří Veisser to the countertenor of Jan Vančura. The musical repertoire of the Rangers at that time consisted of Anglo-American traditionals, folk pop and country music with Czech lyrics.

Between 1966–1969 Jarka Hadrabová sang in the band and they won the first two Portas (1967 and 1968) in the category Country & Western. The Rangers' hits were cover versions of "The Water Is Wide" (1724, Rákosí), "Cotton Fields" (1941, Pole s bavlnou) sung as Gospel music, "King of the Road" (1965, Král silnic), "Come the Day" (1966, Ave Dies), and "Nose For Trouble", (1966, Nos pro trable). An exceptional success was Milan Dufek's Vysočina (Highlands).

In 1971 the Rangers were forced to rename into Plavci (Swimmers). The official reason was that a Czech band name could not be the same as that of "American killers in Vietnam" (the United States Army Rangers). Rivalry between Milan Dufek and Radek Tomášek caused Tomášek to leave the band in 1973. The host Petr Nárožný left the band as well and was replaced by Luděk Nekuda (1942–1988). Plavci were often part of TV shows and their popularity became nationwide. Although between 1974–1976 Nekuda was not with the band, the enormous success of Plavci continued. After he rejoined Plavci they became the number one music band in Czechoslovakia. Nekuda definitively left the band in 1978 and the popularity of Plavci suffered a steady decline.

On 17 November 2005 Milan Dufek died while scuba diving. Radek Tomášek explicitly ruled out a reunion with the rest of the band.

Discography 
only Czech sung LPs.
 The Rangers (I, 1969)
 Rangers 1970 (II, 1970)
 Rangers (III, 1971)
 Plavci (IV, 1973)
 Plavci (V, 1974)
 Sláva (1975)
 Chvála písni (1977)
 Plavci na Poříčí (1978), live
 Otvíráme plovárnu (1980)
 Galaportrét (1984), compilation
 Erb toulavého rodu (1984)
 Výzkumný ústav vodních radostí (1986)

See also 
 Czech bluegrass
 The Seekers

References

External links 
 Official page of the Rangers 
 Official page of Rangers Band 
 Official page of New Rangers 
 Complete discography
 Lyrics 
 Official page of Radek Tomášek 
 Info about Antonín Hájek 
 Obituary of Milan Dufek 
 Encyklopedie Country music 
 Staré televizní pořady s Rangers 
 To nejlepší – samples with names of original songs

Video 
 Balíček karet (original version) (1969) 
 Balíček karet (new version) 
 Mám radost (1971, I Take A Lot Of Pride In What I Am, 1968) 
 Láska je věc kouzelná (1971, Love Is Kind Love is Wine, 1967) 
 Orchidej (1973) 
 Vysočina (1973) 

Czech folk music groups
Czech bluegrass music groups
1964 establishments in Czechoslovakia
Musical groups established in 1964